Tosca Berger Kramer (June 17, 1903 – December 27, 1976) was a New Zealand-born American violinist and violist.  Kramer, along with her parents, was  instrumental in bringing classical music performance and instruction to the state of Oklahoma.

Tosca Berger was the daughter of Kurt and Lucy Berger.  Her father was an eminent conductor and her mother an Impressionist painter.  As a youth Tosca studied violin with Willy Hess and Eugène Ysaÿe, earning a Diploma from the Royal Conservatory at Sondershausen in Thuringia, Germany.  The young New Zealander quickly established herself as a solo concert artist.  In the 1920s a U.S. tour by Berger, who was traveling with her parents, was suspended when Kurt Berger fell ill in Tulsa, Oklahoma.  During the time of his recuperation, Tulsa city leaders succeeded in persuading the Bergers to settle there.  With the encouragement and cooperation of the enterprising Oklahomans, the Berger family established the Tulsa Philharmonic, the city's first symphony orchestra, and Tosca became a highly respected teacher of violin and viola, known for traveling statewide to give lessons.  Among many noted musicians to come from her studio is Fredell Lack, one of the leading violin virtuosi and teachers of her generation.

Tosca married Adolph Kramer, a violinist and string-instrument maker, and the couple adopted four children.  Throughout her adult life, Tosca Kramer continued to be a major force in Oklahoma's musical, cultural, and educational communities, performing as principal (first-chair) violist of the Oklahoma City Symphony and Tulsa Philharmonic, playing benefit concerts for her church, All Souls Unitarian Church (Tulsa, Oklahoma), and playing solo and chamber music recitals on violin, viola, and viola d'amore, and serving on the music faculties of the University of Tulsa, Oklahoma City University, the University of Oklahoma, and University of North Texas College of Music.  In her 60s, already a distinguished artist and pedagogue, Kramer returned to school and earned  both Master of Music and Doctor of Musical Arts degrees from the Eastman School of Music.  She has been described as "perhaps in the history of Tulsa its most outstanding musician."

Tosca Kramer died in Tulsa, Oklahoma, at the age of 73.

She was survived by her four children Donald, Betti, Edi, and Susy. She was also survived by her mother (Lucy Emma Berger) who was five months from her 100th birthday.

Discography 
Includes:
 Music Of Andrea And Giovanni Gabrieli, with the Eastman Wind Ensemble. Mercury Living Presence Series SR-90245 / MG-50245. (1961)

Sources 
 Hill, Regina L. For My Children, Your Ancestors
 Mercury Records Collection
 "NTSU Faculty Adds Kramer".  Dallas Morning News, 16 October 1971.
 Rooney, Dennis.  "Texas Heart". The Strad, January 1990.
 Social Security Death Index
 "Concert Artists." Tulsa Tribune, 30 March 1957.

References 

American classical violinists
American classical violists
Women violists
American classical viola d'amore players
New Zealand emigrants to the United States
New Zealand classical violinists
New Zealand classical violists
New Zealand classical viola d'amore players
Musicians from Tulsa, Oklahoma
Eastman School of Music alumni
University of Tulsa faculty
University of Oklahoma faculty
Oklahoma City University faculty
1903 births
1976 deaths
University of North Texas College of Music faculty
20th-century classical violinists
Women classical violinists
20th-century women musicians
Women music educators
20th-century American violinists
20th-century violists